The ceremony for the 22nd Hong Kong Film Awards was held on 6 April 2003 in the Hong Kong Cultural Centre and hosted by Eric Tsang, John Shum, Athena Chu and Anna Yau. Twenty-seven winners in nineteen categories were unveiled. The year's biggest winner turned out to be Infernal Affairs, which won seven awards, including Best Film, Best Director, Best Screenplay, Best Actor, Best Supporting Actor, Best Film Editing and Best Original Film Song. Besides the eighteen regular awards, the 22nd Hong Kong Film Awards also presented veteran actors Cho Tat Wah and Shek Kin with the Professional Achievement Award.

The ceremony featured a performance by the "Four Heavenly Kings"—Andy Lau, Jacky Cheung, Leon Lai and Aaron Kwok—in memory of Leslie Cheung, who committed suicide on 1 April 2003. Cheung, an established actor and singer, was best remembered for his portrayal of homosexual men in films such as Farewell My Concubine and Happy Together. He was also nominated for Best Actor in this year's Hong Kong Film Awards for his role in Inner Senses.

The ceremony also paid tribute to the local health care workers battling the SARS virus, which hit Hong Kong on 11 March 2003 and would eventually claim 299 deaths there within the subsequent three months. Some present at the ceremony were seen wearing surgical masks to prevent against infection.

Awards
Winners are listed first, highlighted in boldface, and indicated with a double dagger.

External links
 Official website of the Hong Kong Film Awards

2003
2002 film awards
2003 in Hong Kong
Hong